Journal of Ultrasound in Medicine is a medical journal that covers aspects of medical ultrasound, mainly its direct application to patient care but also relevant basic science, and biological effects etc. The journal is published by Wiley.

Abstracting and indexing 
The journal is abstracted and indexed in:

 Basic Science
 Breast Ultrasound
 Contrast-Enhanced Ultrasound
 Dermatology
 Echocardiography
 Elastography
 Emergency Medicine
 Fetal Echocardiography

According to the Journal Citation Reports, the journal has a 2021 impact factor of 2.754.

References

External links 

 

English-language journals
Publications with year of establishment missing
Wiley-Blackwell academic journals
Radiology and medical imaging journals